Başakşehir Çam and Sakura City Hospital, also known as Başakşehir City Hospital, is a large hospital complex in Başakşehir district of Istanbul, Turkey. It was developed jointly by Turkish and Japanese cooperation, symbolized in the name with Çam ve Sakura (English: pine and cherry blossom). The hospital complex opened in May 2020.

History
Başakşehir Çam and Sakura City Hospital is Turkey's third biggest healthcare investment project. It was conducted by the Ministry of Health in a public–private partnership (PPP) model, financed by nine different global finance corporations including the Bank of Japan and Nippon Export and Investment Insurance. The cost of the project was 163 billion Japanese yen (approx. US$1.5 billion).  It was developed by the Turkish Rönesans Healthcare and the Japanese Sojitz Corporation. The construction of the hospital complex began in 2016 and was completed in 2020. 

The healthcare investment project was honored with the "PPP Contract of the Year" prize within Thomson Reuters Foundation's Project Finance International Awards.

The first section of the hospital went into service on 20 April 2020 for the treatment of COVID-19 patients only. On 21 May, the hospital's inauguration ceremony was held with Turkish President Recep Tayyip Erdoğan and Heath Minister Fahrettin Koca. Japanese Prime Minister Shinzo Abe joined the event via video conference. The Turkish–Japanese cooperation of the project was marked in its official name: with çam, Turkish for 'pine', and sakura, Japanese for 'cherry blossom', symbolizing the Turkish and Japanese contributions to the hospital.

Characteristics
The main hospital comprises six blocks built around a core structure, all of which are constructed on a base of over 2,000 seismic base isolators, designed to withstand earthquakes without disruptions to service. According to Building Design+Construction magazine, it was the largest base-isolated building in the world at the time of its opening. The complex has three helipads and a total parking capacity of 8,134. The complex also has  of landscaping, planted with pine and cherry trees.

The hospital complex consists of eight special hospitals.  The six blocks of the main hospital house general medicine, pediatrics, orthopedics and neurology, women's medicine and maternity, cardiac and vascular surgery, and oncology. Two adjacent buildings house the physical medicine and rehabilitation and psychiatry hospitals. There are a total of 725 clinics and 2,682 beds, which can be converted for intensive care medicine when needed. It features 28 delivery wards, 90 operating theaters, a 16-bed burn center and a total of 426 intensive care unit (ICU) beds for newborn babies and adults. About 4,300 medical personnel, 4,050 service personnel and 810 management personnel work in the hospital complex, where up to 32,700 patients can be served daily.

Location and access
Başakşehir City Hospital is situated at Olimpiyat Bulvarı Yolu (Olympic Boulevard Road) in Başakşehir district of Istanbul, Turkey.

The hospital is accessible by city line buses  (MK22)-Taşoluk Peronlar/Fenertepe-Başakşehir Metrokent, (79E) Kayabaşı Kiptaş/Kayaşehir-Eminönü, (79B) Kayaşehir-Bakırköy, (MK22) Taşoluk Peronlar/Fenertepe-Başakşehir Metrokent, and (78F) Başakşehir-Fenertepe-Metrokent.

See also
Ankara Bilkent City Hospital

References

Hospitals in Istanbul
Hospitals established in 2020
2020 establishments in Turkey
Başakşehir
Government-owned hospitals in Turkey